Huanglong is a scenic and historic interest area in the northwest part of Sichuan, China. This area is known for its colorful travertine pools formed by calcite deposits, especially in Huanglonggou (Yellow Dragon Gully), as well as diverse forest ecosystems, snow-capped peaks, waterfalls and hot springs. Huanglong is also home to many endangered species including the giant panda and the Sichuan golden snub-nosed monkey. In addition, a large population of the endemic orchid species 'Cypripedium plectrochilum' was discovered at the site  Huanglong was declared a World Heritage Site by UNESCO in 1992 because of its outstanding travertine formations, waterfalls and limestone formations as well as its travertine terraces and lakes rating among the three most outstanding examples in the world.

Description

Repeated glaciation events, the unique terrane structure, the formation of tufa, the stratum of carbonic acid rock, and climatic conditions such as Arctic-alpine sunlight have created this world-famous travertine landscape. Huanglong covers an area of 700 km2 at an altitude between 1700m and 5588m. Major scenic areas include:
 
 Huanglong Valley
 Danyun Gorge: A canyon more than 1,000 meters in depth. The snow melt from the nearby Mount Xuebaoding travels through this canyon, providing much of the water for the region. 
 Muni Valley
 Xuebaoding – . The highest peak in the Min Mountains
 Xueshan Ridge – , the highest point on the road from Jiuhuang Airport to Huanglong Valley.
 Red Star Rock
 Sigou

Huanglong Valley

The total length of the travertine in Huanglong Valley is 3.6 km and it is thought to look like a huge golden dragon wheeling through the snow-capped mountains of the valley. The main landscapes are travertine banks, colorful ponds and travertine waterfalls and caves. The main body of water starts from the ancient Buddhist/Benbo temple at the top of the valley and ends at the Guests Welcome Pond in the north with a length of 2.5 km and a width of 30–170m. The colours of Huanglong's waters consist of yellows, greens, blues and browns.

Gallery

See also
Baishuitai, Yunnan, China
Badab-e Surt in Iran
Mammoth Hot Springs in Yellowstone Park, United States
Band-e Amir in Afghanistan
Semuc Champey in Guatemala
Plitvice Lakes in Croatia
Pamukkale in Turkey
Travertine

References

External links
 http://www.huanglong.com/

World Heritage Sites in China
Biosphere reserves of China
Huanglong
Geography of Sichuan
Tourist attractions in Sichuan